Kimba Airport  is an airport located  northeast of Kimba, South Australia in the locality of Moseley.

See also
 List of airports in South Australia

References

External links
Kimba Airport at the Kimba District Council

Airports in South Australia
Eyre Peninsula